Ahillya Harjani (born 6 March 1997 in Mumbai, Maharashtra) is an Indian badminton player.

Career
Harjani has represented India in the junior event at the Dutch open, German open and BWF Junior World Championships. In 2013, she was inducted into the Gopichand Badminton Academy, Hyderabad. Until then she was a district and state level player. At the State mixed doubles,  triumphant, she got the opportunity to represent her state at the 37th Junior Nationals in Chandigarh  November 2013 where she won a bronze medal in the mixed doubles. She started playing at an All India level in the year 2014, winning a silver medal at All India Ranking Tournaments in the mixed doubles. Being the most consistent player, she ended the year as India junior No. 1 in the mixed doubles. In the year 2015, she won gold medals in all the All India Ranking Tournaments in the mixed doubles . She also won a gold medal at the 40th Junior Nationals in Jaipur, India in the mixed doubles. Harjani ended the year 2015 as the No.1 junior ranked in mixed doubles in India.

Achievements

BWF International Challenge/Series 
Mixed doubles

  BWF International Challenge tournament
  BWF International Series tournament
  BWF Future Series tournament

References

External links
 
 Mid-day.com
 Badmintoninindia.com

Living people
1997 births
Racket sportspeople from Mumbai
Indian female badminton players
Sportswomen from Maharashtra
21st-century Indian women
21st-century Indian people